White Creek is an unincorporated community located in the town of Easton, Adams County, Wisconsin, United States.

Seth Thompson founded the community, which he originally named Cascade, in 1853. He changed the name to White Creek when he opened its post office in August 1855; the new name came from the white foam on the local creek's surface.

References

Unincorporated communities in Adams County, Wisconsin
Unincorporated communities in Wisconsin